Galearis spectabilis, commonly known as showy orchis or showy orchid, is an orchid species of the genus Galearis. It is native to eastern Canada (Quebec, Ontario and New Brunswick) and much of the eastern half of the United States (from southeastern Oklahoma east to eastern South Dakota and north to Maine and Minnesota).

Description 
Galearis spectabilis can be found in mesic deciduous woodlands in the eastern United States. G. spectabilis begins growth in spring, producing one or two oval, fleshy basal leaves from a rhizome, which persist throughout summer. Flower stalks arise on  stems with three to twelve flowers blooming in April to May. The flowers are hooded and the namesake of the plant due to the showy, typically bicolored lavender and white flowers. The lavender hood is formed from three fused sepals. Two petals are tucked inside the hood and the labellum (third petal) is longer and white. Plants are slow-growing and form clumps over time via crown offshoots from the rhizome.

Pollination of the flower is conducted by long-tongued Bombus, as well as other bees, butterflies, and moths. Besides it alluring colors, G. spectabilis flowers also provide pollinators a nectar reward which collects at the base of the spur. G. spectabilis is typically found on hillsides which may be rocky, damp and near seeps growing under a canopy of deciduous trees in half to deep shade. Plants have also been reported to be found thriving living just about a floodplain, again under a deciduous canopy. Plants are rarely seen in full sun.

There are two color variants: G. spectabilis f. gordinierii has an all-white flower, while G. spectabilis f. willeyi has an entirely pink flower.

References

External links
 
 

spectabilis
Orchids of North America
Flora of Canada
Flora of the Eastern United States
Plants described in 1753
Taxa named by Carl Linnaeus